Elmwood Cemetery is a historic rural cemetery located at Columbia, South Carolina. It was established in 1854, and expanded in 1921.  The older section is heavily wooded and has a section devoted to Confederate dead.

It was added to the National Register of Historic Places in 1996.

References

External links
 
 

Cemeteries on the National Register of Historic Places in South Carolina
1854 establishments in South Carolina
Buildings and structures in Columbia, South Carolina
National Register of Historic Places in Columbia, South Carolina